1178 Irmela, provisional designation , is a stony asteroid from the middle regions of the asteroid belt, approximately 19 kilometers in diameter.

It was discovered on 13 March 1931, by German astronomer Max Wolf at Heidelberg Observatory in southwest Germany. The asteroid was named after Irmela Ruska, wife of Ernst Ruska.

Orbit and classification 

Irmela orbits the Sun in the central main-belt at a distance of 2.2–3.2 AU once every 4 years and 5 months (1,603 days). Its orbit has an eccentricity of 0.18 and an inclination of 7° with respect to the ecliptic.
A first precovery was taken at Lowell Observatory in February 1931, extending the body's observation arc by 3 weeks prior to its official discovery observation at Heidelberg.

Physical characteristics

Lightcurves 

In May 1984, a first rotational lightcurve of Irmela was obtained from photometric observations by American astronomer Richard Binzel. Lightcurve analysis gave a rotation period of 19.17 hours with a brightness variation of 0.34 magnitude.

In March 2010, astronomer Robert Stephens obtained another lightcurve at the Center for Solar System Studies, that gave a divergent period of 11.989 hours with an amplitude of 0.40 magnitude.

Diameter and albedo 

According to the surveys carried out by the Infrared Astronomical Satellite IRAS, the Japanese Akari satellite, and NASA's Wide-field Infrared Survey Explorer with its subsequent NEOWISE mission, Irmela measures between 17.00 and 20.683 kilometers in diameter and its surface has an albedo between 0.0503 and 0.105.

10μm radiometric data collected from Kitt Peak National Observatory in 1975, gave a diameter estimate of 19 kilometers.

The Collaborative Asteroid Lightcurve Link characterizes Irmela as a common S-type asteroid, derives an albedo of 0.0838 and calculates a diameter of 19.05 kilometers with an absolute magnitude of 11.91.

Naming 

This minor planet was named after Irmela Ruska, wife of the inventor of the electron microscope and 1986 Nobelist, the German physicist Ernst Ruska (1906–1988), who shared the Nobel prize with Gerd Binnig and Heinrich Rohrer. The naming was granted by Max Wolf to his colleague August Kopff, himself a prolific discoverer of minor planets. The citation was published by Paul Herget in The Names of the Minor Planets.

References

External links 
  
 Asteroid Lightcurve Database (LCDB), query form (info )
 Dictionary of Minor Planet Names, Google books
 Asteroids and comets rotation curves, CdR – Observatoire de Genève, Raoul Behrend
 Discovery Circumstances: Numbered Minor Planets (1)-(5000) – Minor Planet Center
 
 

001178
Discoveries by Max Wolf
Named minor planets
19310313